Slosh (also known as Russian billiards, Indian pool, Indian billiards, and toad-in-the-hole) is a cue sport played on a snooker table. The game is played to a score of 100 points, or a length of 30 minutes. First played in the early 1900s, not much is known about the game's origins.

Origin

Not much is known about the origins of slosh, other than the alternative name, Russian billiards, is unlikely to have come from Russian descent. Slosh is likely to have been founded around the early 1900s, being derived with the cue sport of snooker from the game of black pool, played with the same balls and table. The game is sometimes known as Indian billiards or Indian pool. These names are sometimes misappropriated to a table carrom game. Other names for the game include toad-in-the-hole (not to be confused with Toad in the hole or the food of the same name) and Russian pool, although it is unknown why these names are used.

A variation of the game, using a red rather than a black ball, is played in Canada. It is known as Canadian Russian billiards, and has a modified set of rules.

Rules
The game is played with seven balls.  These are a white , and six  in different colours: yellow, green, brown, blue, pink and black. A game for two to four players; the first shot must be played towards the black ball, with points being scored for either pocketing the object ball, or playing  shots, pocketing the cue ball. Points may only be scored by pocketing into certain pockets for each individual coloured ball. 

Slosh is played to a total of 100 points. A player can continue to stroke after completing any legal  or carom. Points are awarded for each ball differently, with two points for a pot on the yellow, three for the green, four for the brown, five for the blue, six for the pink and seven for the black. To win, the player must finish on exactly 100 points, or be on the highest amount of points after 30 minutes of play. If the shooter exceeds 100, the score is reduced to 50, but the player can continue their .

Foul shots, such as potting a ball in the incorrect pocket, or playing an  results in points being either deducted from the player's points, or awarded to their opponent.

References

Bibliography

 

Cue sports